CMC Markets is a UK-based financial services company that offers online trading in shares, spread betting, contracts for difference (CFDs) and foreign exchange across world markets. CMC is headquartered in London, with hubs in Sydney and Singapore. It is listed on the London Stock Exchange and is a constituent of the FTSE 250 Index.

History

1989–2000: Early years
The company was founded in 1989 by Peter Cruddas as a Foreign Exchange market maker under the name Currency Management Corporation. The name was later abbreviated to CMC and then changed to CMC Markets in September 2005.

In 1992, CMC Markets became authorised and regulated in the UK by the AFBD which later became the Financial Services Authority (FSA).
 
In 1996, the company launched a real-time FX trading platform and has made claims to have done the first FX deal on-line over the internet.  Although not verifiable, CMC Markets was certainly one of the first companies to offer on-line trading over the internet. The company pioneered internet trading technology with its MarketMaker software platform.

From 1996 to 2000, Information Internet Limited, as well as supplying CMC Markets, sold the software to a small number of banks.  In 2000, Peter Cruddas bought out the other owners, made the software exclusive to CMC Markets and the remaining parts of Information Internet Limited became the internal IT function of CMC Markets.

2000: Introduction of CFDs and financial spread betting 
In 2000, CMC Markets began to offer contracts for difference (CFDs) and the following year it introduced online spread betting on financial markets.  These two products would become the bulk of the business for CMC Markets.

2000–2006: Global expansion
In 2002, the company began embarking on a major global expansion drive.  It expanded quickly between 2002 and 2007 and opened offices in a large number of countries, as well as growing the spread betting business in the UK and the CFD business internationally. This began with its first overseas office in Sydney, Australia headed by Goran Drapac and David Trew.

The first North American office was opened in 2003 in New York headed by Josh Levy. This was followed by the acquisition of Canadian broker Shorcan Index, which became its Toronto office in 2005 headed by Simon Grayson.

From 2001–2005, CMC Markets also operated the brand name deal4free.com. This brand was designed to promote the zero commission charge service, used primarily for its UK-based spread betting business.  Commissions were later re-introduced and this brand was dropped as part of the re-branding in September 2005.

In 2006, the company planned to become a public company via an initial public offering; however, the IPO was cancelled at the last minute due to market conditions.

2007: M&A activity
In 2007, CMC Markets acquired financial media and technology company Digital Look which ran the financial information site Digitallook.com and sold financial data to third party sites. The company was merged into CMC Markets' main operations in London, but continued to run the website and data services for third parties.

Subsequently, CMC Markets bought the Australian stock broker, Andrew West. This was merged with the CMC Markets Australian operation and renamed CMC Markets StockBroking. It continued to offer physical share broking services in Australia.
 
Later in 2007, Goldman Sachs bought a 10% stake in the company for £140m, effectively valuing the company at £1.4bn.

2008–2013: Global financial crisis
In 2008 and 2009, CMC Markets saw profits decline with the global financial crisis. In response, Peter Cruddas changed his management team and closed seven offices and reduced the company headcount from a high of 1,100 employees.

In 2010, CMC Markets launched its Next Generation trading platform to the UK market. The new trading software improved on previous MarketMaker software; amongst other things being able to quote market prices to additional decimal points and provide trade execution without re-quotes.

In 2011, the Digital Look business unit was sold to Spanish-based Web Financial Group.

2014–present
After a return to profits in 2014, speculation emerged that CMC Markets was again looking at an IPO.

In July 2015, CMC Markets started to offer binary options and launched a particular binary option product known as a Countdown.

On 5 February 2016, CMC Markets was first listed on the main market of the London Stock Exchange at 240p equating to an initial market capitalisation of £691 million. On 25 April 2016, CMC Markets launched a range of binary products specifically designed for mobile, tablet and desktop. On 2 June 2016, it was confirmed that from 20 June 2016, CMC Markets would be included as a constituent of the FTSE 250 Index. On 15 November 2016, CMC Markets was awarded "Best CFD Broker" at the Finance Magnates London Summit.

On 6 February 2017, Norwegian Central Bank Norges took 3% stake in CMC Markets.

On 25 September 2018, CMC Markets issued a profit warning which was followed, on 21 November 2018, by an announcement that CMC Markets had suffered a 76% drop in profits.

In April 2019, CMC Markets announced that its CFO & COO, Grant Foley, would leave the business after the shares hit a record low following a profit warning.

Operations
No reliable data exists for the over-the-counter CFD and spread betting industry. However, in 2009, some industry participants commissioned a survey to look at the UK market and results indicated that CMC Markets' market share in 2008 was lower than its main competitor.

References

External links
 CMC Group

Financial services companies based in London
Financial services companies established in 1989
Financial derivative trading companies
Foreign exchange companies
2016 initial public offerings
Online brokerages